Port Moorowie is a small town in the Australian state of South Australia on the south coast of Yorke Peninsula. It has relatively calm beaches and a boat ramp on McLeod Harbour at the western end of Waterloo Bay in Investigator Strait. The town is predominantly a collection of holiday houses and shacks.

References

Coastal towns in South Australia
Yorke Peninsula
Investigator Strait